Lawrence R. Jacobs (born March 6, 1959) is an American political scientist and founder and director of the Center for the Study of Politics and Governance (CSPG) at the University of Minnesota. He was appointed the Walter F. and Joan Mondale Chair for Political Studies at the University of Minnesota’s Humphrey School of Public Affairs in 2005 and holds the McKnight Presidential Chair. Jacobs has written or edited, alone or collaboratively, 17 books and over 100 scholarly articles in addition to numerous reports and media essays on American democracy, national and Minnesota elections, political communications, health care reform, and economic inequality. His latest book is Democracy Under Fire: Donald Trump and the Breaking of American History. In 2020, he was elected a Fellow of the American Academy of Arts and Sciences.

Early life  
Jacobs was born in Brooklyn, New York and raised in Croton-on-Hudson, New York. His father, Henry Jacobs, served in the U.S. Army and worked in New York City as a stenographer, opening his own firm. His mother, Judy Jacobs, was a registered nurse.

Jacobs graduated from Oberlin College in 1981 with a B.A. in History and English and received his Ph.D. from Columbia University in political science in 1990.

Career as researcher  
Recurring topics in Jacobs' research include American democracy, health care reform, political communications, and central banking.

American democracy
Jacobs' first book, The Health of Nations, and related studies identified the political and institutional conditions that explain why two broadly similar countries – the U.S. and Britain – designed dramatically different health programs, the National Health Service in 1946 and the Medicare Act of 1965. He used American and British archival evidence to demonstrate that the preferences of citizens along with the organization of interest groups and the administrative capacity of government institutions were critical factors in accounting for the cross-national differences.

Jacobs’s 2000 book Politicians Don’t Pander (co-authored with Robert Y. Shapiro) looked at how changes in contemporary American politics and, especially, political parties altered the conditions that had facilitated some level of government responsiveness prior to the 1970s; the result is a more insular policy-making process that is less responsive to the preferences of most citizens. The book stated that the motivations of politicians during the 1980s and 1990s shifted from responding to majority opinion to crafting the words, arguments, and symbols to change public opinion to support the policies political elites and their allies and donors favored. Politicians Don’t Pander received awards from the American Political Science Association, the American Sociological Association, and the John F. Kennedy School of Government at Harvard University.

Jacobs extended his analysis of elite efforts at manipulation with James N. Druckman in the 2015 book Who Governs? Presidents, Public Opinion, and Manipulation. Citing polls and other evidence from presidential archives, they reported that presidents starting with Lyndon Johnson used their private research on public opinion to design arguments and personal images to build personal popularity and win elections in order to defy the policy preferences of most Americans. 

Jacobs’s investigation of the sources of U.S. international economic and foreign policy confirmed the pattern of weak government unresponsiveness to the policy preferences of most Americans. In a 2005 study with Benjamin Page published in American Political Science Review, Jacobs' statistical analyses found that the views of business executives (rather than public opinion and policy experts) drove the policy of senior U.S. government officials.

Health care reform
Jacobs has published books on the passage of Medicare in 1965, the enactment of the Affordable Care Act in 2010, and the failure of Bill Clinton’s effort at health reform in 1993-94. His 2015 book on the Affordable Care Act, Health Care Reform and American Politics: What Everyone Needs to Know, co-written with Theda Skocpol, is in its third printing.

Jacobs has used his research on health policy to rethink the sources and effects of government policy. Typically, political observers focus on the impacts of public opinion, organized interest groups, and other forces on policy. Jacobs' work with political scientists Suzanne Mettler and Ling Zhu, in such journal articles as "What Health Reform Teaches Us About American Politics," considers instead how the passage of the Affordable Care Act is changing public opinion to support the law and spurring more Americans to alter their political behavior – including voting – to back health reform.

Political communications 
Jacobs' book Talking Together: Public Deliberation in America and the Search for Community (co-authored with Fay Lomax Cook, and Michael X. Delli Carpini) and related work comprised the first national empirical study of how Americans attempted to persuade each other about matters of politics or met in formally organized deliberative forums to discuss community concerns. The research in Talking Together indicated that more than one out of four Americans join organized deliberations – on par with more traditional forms of political engagement such as contacting a government official or attempting to persuade someone to vote for a favored candidate.

Central banks
Central banks and, specifically, the political dynamics of their policies is one of Jacobs' recent areas of research. His book Fed Power: How Finance Wins, written with Desmond King, is an investigation of the Federal Reserve Bank’s bias toward finance in its response to the 2008 financial crisis. Fed Power was updated in its second edition to cover the impact on the Biden administration by Black Lives Matter protests and the growing influence of progressives in the Democratic Party. More recently, Jacobs and King are investigating the variations across western countries in how central banks regulate risk, manage access to capital, and respond to the inequality generated by their policies.

Jacobs is a longstanding co-editor of the University of Chicago Press series in American politics.

Professor Jacobs’ research has received a number of awards as well as grants from, among others, the National Science Foundation, Ford Foundation, Pew Charitable Trusts, Robert Wood Johnson Foundation, and the McKnight Foundation.

Career as public intellectual 
Jacobs is a leading public intellectual, offering non-partisan commentary and programming on American politics and government policy. In 2005, Jacobs founded the Center for the Study of Politics and Governance (CSPG) at the University of Minnesota’s Humphrey School of Public Affairs. Under his direction, it has become a regional hub for research and initiatives to strengthen democratic institutions and civic engagement, with a mission to foster conversations and collaborations across the partisan divides in Minnesota and America. CSPG developed the first online non-partisan professional training program for election administrators. It also runs an iconic leadership development program called the Policy Fellows, which has supported Minnesota’s civic culture for three decades. Its alumni include U.S. Senator Amy Klobuchar, former U.S. Senator Norm Coleman and many other prominent leaders in government, business, and non-profits. The Center also works closely with legislators in Minnesota by convening an annual one-day retreat of the entire legislature known as One Minnesota. It also collaborates on a similar initiative across the Midwest with the Council of State Governments. In addition, CSPG hosts dozens of public events on state and national politics and public policy each year.

Professor Jacobs runs the "Dialogue Across Difference" series, which has drawn over 100,000 viewers to its live conversations, YouTube recordings, and podcasts. 

Jacobs has been widely recognized for his non-partisan work with CSPG, the media, and civic organizations. The Minneapolis University Rotary Club awarded Jacobs its “Citizen of the Year Award” in 2017. The University of Minnesota recognized his community engagement with its “Outstanding Community Service Award” in 2014.

In 2003, he chaired the American Political Science Association's Task Force on Inequality and
American Democracy, the organization's first formal task force in half a century on the consequences of rising economic inequality for American democracy. The Task Force’s report in 2005 spurred increased media attention, research, and teaching on the political effects of rising economic and racial disparities.

For nearly 15 years, Jacobs taught with former Vice President Walter Mondale at the Humphrey School. Their course concentrated on the U.S. Constitution and national security and tracked the growing pattern across Democratic and Republican administrations of unilateral exercises of executive power since the Second World War.

Personal life
Jacobs is married to Julie Schumacher, a Regents Professor of English at the University of Minnesota. She is also a novelist, most notably for Dear Committee Members, for which she became the first woman to win the Thurber Prize for American Humor. She has also written seven other novels as well as numerous short stories, which have been anthologized in the O. Henry Awards and The Best American Short Stories collections. They met in an English class during their first year at Oberlin College.

They have two adult daughters, Emma Lillian Jacobs and Isabella Nan Jacobs Hale.

Selected publications

Books
Lawrence R. Jacobs, The Health of Nations: Public Opinion and the Making of American and British Health Policy (1993)
Lawrence R. Jacobs and Robert Y. Shapiro. Politicians Don't Pander: Political Manipulation and the Loss of Democratic Responsiveness (2000)
Lawrence R. Jacobs and Theda Skocpol, eds., Inequality and American Democracy: What We Know and What We Need to Learn (2005)
James A. Morone and Lawrence R. Jacobs, eds., Healthy, Wealthy, and Fair: Health Care and the Good Society (2005)
Lawrence R. Jacobs, Fay Lomax Cook, and Michael Delli Carpini, Talking Together: Public Deliberation in America and the Search for Community (2009)
Lawrence R. Jacobs and Desmond King, eds., The Unsustainable American State (2009)
Lawrence D. Brown and Lawrence R. Jacobs, eds., The Private Abuse of the Public Interest: Market Myths and Policy Muddles (2009)
Benjamin I. Page and Lawrence R. Jacobs, eds., Class War?: What Americans Really Think about Economic Inequality (2009)
Theda Skocpol and Lawrence R. Jacobs, eds., Reaching for a New Deal: Ambitious Governance, Economic Meltdown, and Polarized Politics in Obama's First Two Years (2011)
Lawrence R. Jacobs and Desmond King, eds., Obama at the Crossroads: Politics, Markets, and the Battle for America's Future (2012)
Robert Y. Shapiro and Lawrence R. Jacobs, eds., The Oxford Handbook of American Public Opinion and the Media (2013)
James N. Druckman and Lawrence R. Jacobs, Who Governs? Presidents, Public Opinion, and Manipulation (2015)
Lawrence Jacobs and Theda Skocpol, Health Care Reform and American Politics: What Everyone Needs to Know (2015)
Lawrence R. Jacobs and Desmond King, Fed Power: How Finance Wins (2016, second edition 2021)
Lawrence R. Jacobs, Democracy Under Fire: Donald Trump and the Breaking of American History (2022)

Journal articles
Lawrence R. Jacobs, Robert Y. Shapiro, "Public Opinion and the New Social History: Some Lessons for the Study of Public Opinion and Democratic Policy-making." Social Science History (1989)
Lawrence R. Jacobs, “The Recoil Effect: Public Opinion and Policymaking in the U.S. and Britain.” Comparative Politics (January 1992)
 Lawrence R. Jacobs, “Institutions and Culture: Health Policy and Public Opinion in the U.S. and Britain.” World Politics (January 1992)
 Lawrence R. Jacobs, "Health Reform Impasse: The Politics of American Ambivalence toward Government." Journal of Health Politics, Policy and Law (1993) 
Lawrence R. Jacobs, Robert Y. Shapiro, "Studying Substantive Democracy." PS: Political Science & Politics (1994)
Lawrence R. Jacobs, Robert Y. Shapiro, "Questioning the Conventional Wisdom on Public Opinion Toward Health Reform." PS: Political Science & Politics (1994)
Lawrence R. Jacobs, Robert Y. Shapiro, "Issues, Candidate Image, and Priming: The Use of Private Polls in Kennedy's 1960 Presidential Campaign." American Political Science Review (1994)
 Lawrence R. Jacobs, Robert Y. Shapiro, "Don't Blame the Public for Failed Health Care Reform." Journal of Health Politics, Policy and Law (1995)
 Lawrence R. Jacobs, "Talking Heads and Sleeping Citizens: Health Policy Making in a Democracy." Journal of Health Politics, Policy and Law (1996) 
Lawrence R. Jacobs, Robert Y. Shapiro, "Toward the Integrated Study of Political Communications, Public Opinion, and the Policy-making Process." PS: Political Science & Politics (1996)
Greg M. Shaw, Robert Y. Shapiro, Lawrence R. Jacobs, "Searching Presidential Documents On-Line: Advantages and Limitations." PS: Political Science & Politics (1996)
Lawrence R. Jacobs, Eric D. Lawrence, Robert Y. Shapiro, Steven S. Smith, "Congressional Leadership of Public Opinion." Political Science Quarterly (1998)
Lawrence R. Jacobs, Robert Y. Shapiro, "The American Public’s Pragmatic Liberalism Meets Its Philosophical Conservativism." Journal of Health Politics, Policy and Law (1999) 
Lawrence R. Jacobs, Robert Y. Shapiro, "Lyndon Johnson, Vietnam, and Public Opinion: Rethinking Realist Theory of Leadership." Presidential Studies Quarterly (1999)
 Lawrence R. Jacobs, "Manipulators and Manipulation: Public Opinion in a Representative Democracy." Journal of Health Politics, Policy and Law (2001) 
 Lawrence R. Jacobs, "The Shadow Welfare State: Labor, Business, and the Politics of Health Care in the United States." Journal of Health Politics, Policy and Law (2002)
Lawrence R. Jacobs, Benjamin I. Page, Melanie Burns, Gregory McAvoy, Eric Ostermeier, "What Presidents Talk about: The Nixon Case." Presidential Studies Quarterly (2003)
 Michael X. Delli Carpini, Fay Lomax Cook, and Lawrence R. Jacobs, “Public Deliberation, Discursive Participation, and Citizen Engagement: A Review of The Empirical Literature.” Annual Review of Political Science (2004)
Lawrence R. Jacobs, "Funding Innovative Research: The Robert Wood Johnson Programs for Political Scientists." PS: Political Science & Politics (2004)
Lawrence R. Jacobs,  Melanie Burns. "The Second Face of the Public Presidency: Presidential Polling and the Shift from Policy to Personality Polling." Presidential Studies Quarterly (2004)
James N. Druckman, Lawrence R. Jacobs, Eric Ostermeier, "Candidate Strategies to Prime Issues and Image." The Journal of Politics (2004)
Lawrence R. Jacobs and Benjamin I. Page, “Who Influences U.S. Foreign Policy?” American Political Science Review (February 2005)
Theda Skocpol and Lawrence R. Jacobs,, "Restoring the Tradition of Rigor and Relevance to Political Science." PS: Political Science & Politics (2006)
James N. Druckman, Lawrence R. Jacobs. "Lumpers and Splitters: The Public Opinion Information That Politicians Collect and Use." The Public Opinion Quarterly (2006)
 Lawrence R. Jacobs, "The Medicare Approach: Political Choice and American Institutions." Journal of Health Politics, Policy and Law (2007)
 Michael S. Sparer, Lawrence D. Brown, Lawrence R. Jacobs, "Exploring the Concept of Single Payer." Journal of Health Politics, Policy and Law (2009)
Joe Soss, Lawrence R. Jacobs, "The Place of Inequality: Non-participation in the American Polity." Political Science Quarterly (2009)
Lawrence R. Jacobs, "Building Reliable Theories of the Presidency." Presidential Studies Quarterly (2009)
 Lawrence R. Jacobs, “What Health Reform Teaches Us About American Politics.” PS: Political Science & Politics (October 2010)
Lawrence R. Jacobs and Desmond King, "Varieties of Obamaism: Structure, Agency, and the Obama Presidency." Perspectives on Politics (2010)
Fay Lomax Cook, Lawrence R. Jacobs, and Dukhong Kim. "Trusting What You Know: Information, Knowledge, and Confidence in Social Security." The Journal of Politics (2010)
 Lawrence R. Jacobs, "America's Critical Juncture: The Affordable Care Act and Its Reverberations." Journal of Health Politics, Policy and Law (2011) 
 Lawrence R. Jacobs, Suzanne Mettler, "Why Public Opinion Changes: The Implications for Health and Health Policy." Journal of Health Politics, Policy and Law (2012)
Theda Skocpol, Lawrence R. Jacobs, "Accomplished and Embattled: Understanding Obama's Presidency." Political Science Quarterly (2012)
Lawrence R. Jacobs, Eric P. Schwartz. "Presidential Power and the Internationalization of Domestic Policy." Georgetown Journal of International Affairs (2012)
 Lawrence R. Jacobs, Timothy Callaghan, "Why States Expand Medicaid: Party, Resources, and History." Journal of Health Politics, Policy and Law (2013)
Lawrence R. Jacobs, "The Public Presidency and Disciplinary Presumptions." Presidential Studies Quarterly (2013)
Lawrence R. Jacobs, "Lord Bryce's Curse: The Costs of Presidential Heroism and the Hope of Deliberative Incrementalism." Presidential Studies Quarterly (2013)
Timothy Callaghan and Lawrence R. Jacobs, "Process Learning and the Implementation of Medicaid Reform." Publius: The Journal of Federalism (2014)
Lawrence R. Jacobs, "Health Reform and the Future of American Politics." Perspectives on Politics (2014)
Lawrence R. Jacobs, "The Contested Politics of Public Value." Public Administration Review (2014)
Lawrence R. Jacobs, Michael Illuzzi, "In the Shadow of 9/11: Health Care Reform in the 2004 Presidential Election." The Journal of Law, Medicine & Ethics (2016)
 Lawrence Jacobs and Suzanne Mettler, “When and How New Policy Creates New Politics: Examining the Feedback Effects of the Affordable Care Act on Public Opinion.” Perspectives on Politics (June 2018)
 Lawrence Jacobs and Desmond King, “The Fed’s Political Economy.” PS: Political Science & Politics (October 2018)
 Lawrence R Jacobs, Suzanne Mettler, and Ling Zhu, “Affordable Care Act Moving to New Stage of Public Acceptance.” Journal of Health Politics, Policy and Law (December 2019)
Ling Zhu, Suzanne Mettler, and Lawrence Jacobs, "The Pathways of Policy Feedback: How Health Reform Influences Political Efficacy and Participation." Policy Studies Journal (2021)
Lawrence Jacobs and Suzanne Mettler,  "What Health Reform Tells Us About American Politics." Journal of Health Politics, Policy and Law (August 2020) (Most read JHPPL article published in 2020)

Op-eds
Lawrence R. Jacobs, “Third Party Guys, The Real Threat.” Washington Post (October 19, 2003)
Theda Skocpol and Lawrence Jacobs, “Bending Toward Universal Health Care.” New York Times (June 28, 2012)
Lawrence Jacobs, “Right vs. Left in the Midwest.” New York Times (November 23, 2013)
Lawrence R. Jacobs and Joanne M. Miller, “Ranked-Choice Voting: By the Data, Still Flawed.” Star Tribune (February 13, 2014) 
Lawrence Jacobs and Desmond King, “Why the Fed Still Needs Fixing.” The Hill (May 19, 2016)
Lawrence Jacobs, “Wake up and see the Trump card: He can win.” Star Tribune (May 23, 2016)
Lawrence Jacobs, “Republicans are radicalizing Democrats. Just look at healthcare.” The Guardian (September 13, 2017)
Lawrence Jacobs, “Thinking of Walter Mondale near his 90th birthday.” Star Tribune (January 15, 2018)
Lawrence Jacobs, “Our political divide now extends even to (I'm not kidding) … poker.” Star Tribune (February 14, 2018)
Lawrence Jacobs, “The cluelessness of the elites.” Star Tribune (March 9, 2019)
Lawrence Jacobs, “Minnesota's urban-rural divide is no lie.” Star Tribune (July 28, 2019)
 Doug Chapin and Lawrence Jacobs, “Conducting a safe national election during a pandemic will be difficult.” Star Tribune (April 3, 2020)

References

External links
Lawrence Jacobs website at CSPG
Center for the Study of Politics and Governance website
CSPG events and CSPG events archive
Julie Schumacher website

1959 births
Living people
Academics from Minnesota
Columbia Graduate School of Arts and Sciences alumni
Oberlin College alumni
American political scientists
Writers from Brooklyn